The 2022 North Carolina Central Eagles football team represented North Carolina Central University as a member of the Mid-Eastern Athletic Conference (MEAC) during the 2022 NCAA Division I FCS football season. The Eagles, led by third-year head coach Trei Oliver, played their home games at O'Kelly–Riddick Stadium. They won their fourth black college football national championship in school history by defeating then-undefeated Jackson State in Celebration Bowl, 41–34.

Previous season

The Eagles finished the 2021 season with a record of 6–5, 4–1 MEAC play to finish in second place.

Schedule

Game summaries

vs North Carolina A&T

Winston-Salem State

at No. 25 New Hampshire

Virginia–Lynchburg

at Campbell

Morgan State

at South Carolina State

at Delaware State

Howard

at Norfolk State

at Tennessee Tech

vs. No. 10 Jackson State

References

North Carolina Central
North Carolina Central Eagles football seasons
Black college football national champions
Mid-Eastern Athletic Conference football champion seasons
Celebration Bowl champion seasons
North Carolina Central Eagles football